Problem Child 2 is a 1991 American black comedy film, and a sequel to the 1990 film Problem Child; a continuation of the exploits of Junior (Michael Oliver), an adopted orphan boy who deliberately wreaks comedic havoc everywhere he goes. John Ritter returns as his adopted father, Ben Healy. Amy Yasbeck, who played Ben's wife, Flo, in the first film, also returns, this time as school nurse Annie Young who has a daughter named Trixie Young (Ivyann Schwan) who's also a problem child.

It was directed by Brian Levant in his feature film directorial debut and produced by Robert Simonds, who also produced the first film. In addition, Scott Alexander and Larry Karaszewski return as screenwriters. It was rated PG-13, unlike its predecessor, which was rated PG. The film did not fare as well as its predecessor, although it was still successful at the box office.

Plot
Ben Healy and his son, Junior, move to Mortville, Oregon, a quiet community, as a way to start over. Ben is initially sad to be leaving Cold River until Junior reminds him that everyone there has been horrible to him his whole life. Before they arrive at their new house, Junior sees a girl roller skating on the sidewalk with a balloon. He pops it with his sling shot and laughs at her as he goes by. Ben and Junior arrive at their new house, and moments later, dozens of women line up in their front yard, all of them wanting to date Ben. Meanwhile, Ben's father, Big Ben Healy, arrives to live with them when he loses all of his money in a bad investment.
 
When Junior starts his first day of third grade, he sees that Igor Peabody is the principal of his new school. Peabody panics at the sight of him and promptly promotes him to the sixth grade. He gets on school bully Murph's bad side when he tapes him to the chalkboard. Murph retaliates by trying to drop the school's satellite dish on Junior, but it misses him and hits Ben instead, knocking him out. When Ben comes to, he sees school nurse Annie Young and becomes smitten with her. Junior, annoyed at Ben's sudden love interest, retaliates by attempting to draw a mustache on Annie's picture hanging in the hall, only to be foiled by Trixie, the girl whose balloon he popped earlier. Throughout the film, Trixie and Junior engage in an escalating prank war.

Around the same time, LaWanda DuMore, the richest lady in Mortville, takes an interest in Ben, much to Junior's chagrin. While Ben and Junior are gone for the day, she decorates the house to impress Ben. Junior ruins a dinner LaWanda makes by putting live cockroaches in the food. Afterwards, she tells him that when she is his stepmother she will send him to boarding school in Baghdad. He tries to tell Ben that she is bad, but Ben does not believe him. 

While at a school function, Ben sees the puppet show go awry and thinks Junior is to blame. He stops it but is surprised to see it was Trixie ruining it. It is also revealed that Annie is her mother. Annie rushes to take her home: Ben tries to tell her he understands what it is like raising a problem child and thinks they can help one another. She tells him she likes him, but if they date, Trixie's behavior would only get worse. He proposes to LaWanda believing she is the only woman who will marry him.
 
By a chance meeting in a pizza restaurant, Ben, Annie, Junior, and Trixie have dinner together and have a good time, even after the food fight the kids start with Mr. Peabody and his girlfriend gets them thrown out. Junior and Trixie apologize and decide their parents should date. Junior tries to stop the wedding by switching LaWanda's blood sample with that of a rabid dog. While celebrating her engagement to Ben, she gets cake icing on her face, which bears a resemblance to foaming at the mouth, a symptom of rabies. As a result, she is handcuffed by animal control officers and sent to the hospital for observation. With her there, Junior overhears a patient in the room across from hers saying he wants to hold the world record for the world's longest nose. He sabotages her plastic surgery by switching the patient files, resulting in her receiving a gigantic nose – Junior's attempt to make LaWanda so ugly that Ben will not marry her. However, she uses her funds to get last minute surgery to undo the damage. At the altar, Junior's and Trixie's work pays off, and Ben finally realizes that Annie is the one for him when he realized that Junior was telling the truth about LaWanda after she openly said that she hates children (much to his shock). Big Ben decides to marry the now-single LaWanda, while Junior and Trixie use explosives to splatter both of them with the wedding cake.

Cast

Production
The film was shot on location in Orlando, Florida from January 16 to March 15, 1991, including the then newly, opened Universal Studios Florida. The "Pizzariffic" scene was filmed at a small, vacant restaurant on Orlando Avenue in Maitland (which became Buca di Beppo 2 years later). The gift shop in the opening montage is on International Drive in Orlando. At another point in the opening montage, Junior and Ben get donuts from Randy's Donuts in Inglewood, California. The scenes for the Healys' house were filmed at 1216 Lancaster Drive in Orlando. When Junior and Ben are leaving Cold River at the beginning, they are driving down Atlanta Avenue in Orlando. All of the "Mortville Elementary School" scenes were filmed at Orlando's Kaley Elementary School. Napasorn Thai on East Pine Street in Downtown Orlando was used for the Dunmore Bank, as evidenced by the restaurant's unique inlaid corner windows visible in the scene. Orlando's Harry P. Leu Gardens was used as the "Love Rock" backdrop for the wedding scene. The Hyatt Regency Orlando was used as the "Saint Pierre Club" backdrop for Ben and Debbie's date scene.

In 2014, during an interview on Gottfried's Amazing Colossal Podcast, screenwriters Alexander and Karaszewski revealed that the studio was reluctant to rehire them, only doing so because they wanted to shoot a sequel before Michael Oliver could noticeably grow and, as the writers of the first film, could produce a script quicker than writers new to the story and characters.

Frustrated with the criticisms of the first film, they deliberately increased the poor taste, intending to make a Pasolini or John Waters film for children, and went so far overboard that the first cut received an R rating from the MPAA, a secret kept until their 2014 appearance on the podcast. Dubbing over Junior's use of the term "pussy-whipped" got a PG-13 on appeal, but the studio was still so nervous that, at the last minute, they added the 1947 Woody Woodpecker cartoon Smoked Hams to its theatrical run, to reassure parents that it was suitable for children.

Reception
The film did not fare as well as the first one, earning half as much at the U.S. box-office. Rotten Tomatoes reports that 7% of 27 surveyed critics gave it a positive review, with an average rating of 3.3/10. The site's consensus reads: "Crude, rude, puerile, and pointless, Problem Child 2 represents a cynical nadir in family-marketed entertainment". Audiences surveyed by CinemaScore gave the film a grade "B+" on scale of A to F.

Variety wrote: "At times this poor version of a sitcom seems written by five-year-olds for five-year-olds, so much so that one suspects its script was fingerpainted".

TV version
Problem Child 2 first aired on NBC-TV on November 2, 1992, with 7 minutes of previously deleted scenes, an altered scene (in Peabody's office, Junior burps rather than let out a long fart) and the profanity was dubbed with appropriate phrases.

References

External links
 
 

1991 films
1991 comedy films
American comedy films
American sequel films
Films set in Oregon
Films shot in Florida
Films about adoption
Films directed by Brian Levant
Films produced by Robert Simonds
Films scored by David Kitay
Universal Pictures films
Imagine Entertainment films
Films with screenplays by Scott Alexander and Larry Karaszewski
1991 directorial debut films
Films about father–son relationships
1990s English-language films
1990s American films